German submarine U-793 was a Type XVIIA U-boat of Nazi Germany's Kriegsmarine during the Second World War. She was one of a small number of U-boats fitted with Hellmuth Walter's high test peroxide propulsion system, which offered a combination of air-independent propulsion and high submerged speeds. She spent the war as a trials vessel and was scuttled on 4 May 1945 in the Audorfer See, near Rendsburg.

Construction 
The U-793 was laid down on 1 December 1942 at the Blohm & Voss, Hamburg, as yard number 456. She was launched on 4 March 1944 and commissioned under the command of Oberleutnant zur See Günther Schauenburg on 24 April 1944.

She was assessed at  submerged. She had one shaft and one propeller.

The submarine was fitted with two  torpedo tubes (All fitted at the bow) and four torpedoes. The boat had a complement of 12 men.

Service history
U-793 did not undertake any war patrols and was instead assigned as a trials boat at first to the 8th U-boat Flotilla, followed by the 5th U-boat Flotilla.

The U-793 was scuttled on 4 May 1945 at 1.30am in the Audorfer See (Kaiser Wilhelm Canal), near Rendsburg during Operation Regenbogen.

Wreck 
The wreck of U-793 lay at  until 26 May 1945, when she was lifted by the British and taken to the Howaldtswerke in Kiel to be examined. She was first raised as a British prize and used for trials, but was soon torn down for parts and finally scrapped.

References

Bibliography

German Type XVII submarines
U-boats commissioned in 1944
World War II submarines of Germany
Ships built in Hamburg
Operation Regenbogen (U-boat)
1944 ships
Maritime incidents in May 1945